Ethmia coronata is a moth in the family Depressariidae. It is found in south-central Mexico.

The ground color of the forewings is dark gray, narrowly edged with white dorsally. The ground color of the hindwings is semitranslucent, white and reflecting purplish, becoming brownish in the apical area. Adults are on wing in June, September and October.

References

Moths described in 1912
coronata